Marsh Lock is a lock and weir situated on the River Thames in England, about 1 mile upstream of Henley Bridge in Henley-on-Thames, Oxfordshire. The lock is close to the Berkshire bank, but accessed from the Oxfordshire side via two long walkways, the downstream one being near Mill Meadows. The first pound lock was built by the Thames Navigation Commission in 1773.

The weir consists of a series of iron watergates running from the lock to the Oxfordshire bank near the mills. It is situated between the two walkways.

History
The earliest record of a flash lock is in 1580, but the lock and weir existed for some time before that. The pound lock was the third downstream of the eight locks built after the navigation act of 1770, and was completed in fir wood in 1773.  Humphrey Gainsborough, a non-conformist minister at Henley Congregational Church was concerned in the building of the lock. He was an inventor and the brother of the artist Thomas Gainsborough. By 1780 the lock was reported as decaying fast, and in 1787 it was rebuilt of oak. The first lock-house was built in 1813. Positioned as it was on the opposite side of the tow path, the lock was considered "Extremely inconvenient and dangerous for barges" in 1814 and there are some indications that the flash lock was still in use.

In 1843 the lock was in poor condition and plans were drawn up to rebuild it on the opposite side of the river. However these came to nothing and the lower walkway was built about this time. The weir was rebuilt after 1879 but with some complaints about its unattractiveness. There were again proposals to move the lock across the river but it was rebuilt of more solid timber and reopened in 1886. The lock was rebuilt again in 1914. The weir was reconstructed in 2004 by Mowlem PLC to a design by Halcrow Group.

Access to the lock

Because the lock is unusually situated on the opposite side of the river to the towpath, a long wooden bridge was built from the Oxfordshire bank to carry the path out to the lock island below the weir, and then back again to the riverbank above the weir. This feature is unique on the River Thames.

Reach above the lock

At the lock and beyond it on the Berkshire bank there are steep hills, which give way to Wargrave Marsh, an expanse of water meadows, after the entrance to the Hennerton Backwater. At this point, Bolney Ferry used to operate across the river. The island here is called Ferry Eyot and it is followed by Poplar Eyot and Handbuck Eyot. This chain of islands lies off a range of large houses at Shiplake.

The river then rejoins Hennerton Backwater and passes Wargrave on the Berkshire bank while there is then open farmland on the Shiplake bank. The River Loddon flows in on the Berkshire side and the river is crossed by Shiplake Railway Bridge just below Shiplake Lock. The Wargrave & Shiplake Regatta takes place on the reach downstream of the railway bridge in August.

Thames Path
The Thames Path follows the river on the western bank and then takes a diversion through Shiplake, rejoining the river at Shiplake Lock. This diversion arises because: firstly, the towpath used to cross the river at Bolney Ferry and return at Lashbrook Ferry a short way upstream; secondly there is no easy access to rejoin the path for the section between Lashbrook Ferry and Shiplake Lock.

See also

 Locks on the River Thames
 Rowing on the River Thames
 River and Rowing Museum

References

Locks of Berkshire
Henley-on-Thames
Locks on the River Thames
Weirs on the River Thames